Cadena is a surname. Notable people with the surname include:

Ana Lilia Garza Cadena (born 1970), Mexican politician
Carlos Cadena (1917–2001), Mexican American lawyer, civil rights activist and judge
Carlos Cadena Gaitan (born 1983), journalist and affiliated researcher with the United Nations University
Daniel Cadena (born 1987), Spanish footballer
Dez Cadena (born 1961), American punk rock singer and guitarist
Eva Cadena, Mexican politician from Veracruz
Francisco Páez de la Cadena (born 1951), Spanish garden historian
Freddy Cadena (born 1963), Ecuadorian orchestra conductor
José Torres Cadena (born 1952), former football (soccer) referee from Colombia
Julio César Cadena (born 1963), Colombian former racing cyclist
Lloyd Cadena (1993–2020), Filipino vlogger, radio personality, and author
Manuel Cadena Morales (born 1948), Mexican politician
Mariano Velazquez de la Cadena (1778–1860), Mexican American grammarian, scholar and author
Ozzie Cadena (1924–2008), American record producer
Ricardo Cadena (born 1969), Mexican retired footballer
Rodolfo Cadena (1943–1972), Mexican-American mob boss and member of the Mexican Mafia prison gang
Rodrigo de la Cadena (born 1988), Mexican singer, performer, songwriter, radio host and musician
Tony Cadena, a stage name of punk rock singer/songwriter and poet Anthony Brandenburg (born 1963)

See also

Cadena (comics), a Marvel Comics character
Lacadena (disambiguation)